"2Face" is Beni's tenth single under the label Nayutawave Records. "2Face" is a "fierce song about a woman who can't be honest". The single is limited to 10,000 copies and comes with a special towel. According to Beni's blog, this song "should showcase a new Beni"
In the first week of the Chaku-Uta weekly charts, the song 2FACE charted at #25. On the Chaku-Uta weekly chart Full it was ranked at #42.

Track list

References

2010 singles
Beni (singer) songs
2010 songs